Lake Blanche is a salt lake in central South Australia that lies below sea level.  It is located within the Strzelecki Creek Wetland System which is listed on A Directory of Important Wetlands in Australia. It also is within the extent of the Strzelecki Desert Lakes Important Bird Area, identified as such by BirdLife International because of its importance for waterbirds when holding water in the aftermath of floods.

See also

 List of lakes of South Australia
Strzelecki Regional Reserve

References

Blanche
Blanche
Lake Eyre basin